A Dangerous Adventure is a 1937 American drama film directed by D. Ross Lederman.

Cast
 Don Terry as Tim Sawyer
 Rosalind Keith as Linda Gale
 Russell Hicks as Allen
 John Gallaudet as Hadley
 Nana Bryant as Marie
 Frank C. Wilson as Depan
 Marc Lawrence as Calkins
 Joe Sawyer as Dutch

References

External links
 

1937 films
1937 drama films
American drama films
American black-and-white films
1930s English-language films
Films directed by D. Ross Lederman
Columbia Pictures films
1930s American films